Lyclene is a genus of lichen moths of the family Erebidae, subfamily Arctiinae. The genus was erected by Frederic Moore in 1860.

Taxonomy
The genus is closely allied to Asura or Barsine and various species are alternatively placed under these genera.

Species

Formerly placed here

References

Dubatolov, V. V. & Bucsek, K. (2013). "New species of lichen-moths from South-East Asia (Lepidoptera, Noctuoidea, Lithosiini)". Tinea. 22 (4): 279–291.
Singh Kirti, J. & Singh Gill, N. (2009). "Description of four new species of the genus Lyclene Moore (Lepidoptera: Arctiidae: Lithosiinae) from India". Acta zoologica cracoviensia (B). 52 (1-2): 109–118.  
Černý, K. (2012). "Lyclene weidenhofferi sp. n. and Barsine delineata (Walker, 1854) discovered in Thailand (Lepidoptera: Noctuoidea: Erebidae: Arctiinae: Lithosiini)". Nachrichten des Entomologischen Vereins Apollo. N.F. 32 (3-4): 121–123.

External links

Nudariina
Moth genera